Goshū Maru  was requisitioned as an aircraft transport vessel of the Imperial Japanese Navy (IJN). The ship was initially built at Kawasaki's Kōbe Shipyard and launched on 14 October 1939 as a merchant vessel for Goyo Shosen K. K. On 14 September 1940 the IJN requisitioned as a transport ship and was refitted in 1940 as an aircraft transport.  The ship subsequently saw service in the Pacific Campaign of World War II. 1 October, 1943 she was rerated a converted transport (misc). Goshū Maru was sunk by United States Navy aircraft in the Palau Islands on 30 or 31 March 1944.

Notes

References
 

1939 ships
Maritime incidents in March 1944
Ships sunk by US aircraft
Seaplane tenders of the Imperial Japanese Navy
World War II shipwrecks in the Pacific Ocean